Weiner is a 2016 American fly-on-the-wall political documentary film by Josh Kriegman and Elyse Steinberg about Anthony Weiner's campaign for Mayor of New York City during the 2013 mayoral election.

Synopsis
The documentary follows congressman Anthony Weiner and his wife Huma Abedin, shortly after his 2011 resignation when scandalous photos of Weiner mysteriously appeared on his Twitter account. The photos led to a tumultuous spiral as more and more pictures of the congressman in various states of undress began to leak to the public. The documentary revolves around Weiner's attempted comeback from his initial resignation during his 2013 campaign in the Democratic Party primary for Mayor of New York City. His campaign goes well at first, with many New Yorkers willing to give him a second chance as evidenced in polls putting him at or near the top of a tight mayoral race.

During the filming of the documentary, however, additional leaked photos and evidence of online sexual activity surface, including explicit text conversations with women and a teenaged child that occurred well after his 2011 resignation from Congress. The mood of the campaign switches from exuberance to pain. Intimate views are captured of Weiner, his wife and his campaign staff struggling with the new revelations and the media firestorm that ensues. Weiner's wife, an adviser to Hillary Clinton, comes under fire during the scandal. The relationship between the couple gets strenuous, and in a couple of instances, the camera is asked to leave the room. Weiner's campaign manager quits when a press conference is held in which Weiner comes clean about his sexting, and his campaign begins to take a downward spiral. Weiner comes in fifth place in the polls, garnering only 4.9% of the popular vote.

People
People documented in the film include:
 Anthony Weiner
 Huma Abedin, his wife and a close aide to Hillary Clinton
 Sydney Leathers, one of Weiner's online sex partners, who attempts to confront him on election night
 Barbara Morgan, Weiner's communications director
 Camille Joseph, Weiner's campaign manager
 Amit Bagga, Weiner's senior advisor
 Maura Tracy, Weiner's senior staffer
 Andrew Noh, Weiner's campaign aide

The film also features archival footage from:
Bill Clinton
Stephen Colbert
Hillary Clinton
Bill de Blasio
Jay Leno
Jane Lynch
Bill Maher
Lawrence O'Donnell
Barack Obama
Jon Stewart
Donald Trump
Howard Stern

Release
The film premiered at the Sundance Film Festival in January 2016. It was released theatrically in the United States in May 2016 and broadcast on Showtime in October 2016. Starting in June 2014, the film began releasing internationally in the UK, Netherlands, Scandinavia, Australia, and Japan, and television broadcasts in Spain, Italy, France, Germany, Israel, Belgium, and Holland. The film received an R rating from the MPAA for language and some sexual material.

Upon release, Anthony Weiner declined to endorse the film and claimed he had no intention of ever seeing the final product, saying "I already know how it ends."

After the film was released, Weiner claimed that "Kriegman had assured him verbally and in emails that he would not use Abedin in the film without her consent", and that Abedin never granted permission for Kriegman to use the footage. When asked if he will sue the filmmakers, Weiner didn't give a definitive answer. The filmmakers disputed Weiner's claim, stating that they clearly "had consent from everyone who appears in the film, including Anthony and Huma."

Reception

Critical reception
The film received near universal acclaim by critics.  On Metacritic, the film has a weighted average score of 84 out of 100, based on 33 critics, indicating "universal acclaim".

Wendy Ide of The Observer gave it four out of five stars, writing: "Edited to perfection, this is like watching the slow-motion footage of a building collapsing. Weiner’s long-suffering wife, Huma Abedin … is a key sympathetic presence in the film. But it is Weiner himself, a likable narcissist with an Olympic capacity for vanity and self-delusion, who is every documentary-maker's dream subject." 

Brian Lowry of CNN wrote: What Weiner makes painfully clear is the collateral damage of Weiner's actions, not merely on his wife but those who believed in and devoted their energy to his campaign. To that extent, it's possible to share his politics and still see him as a fatally flawed vessel for them.

Box office
The film performed decently, earning a worldwide box office total of $1,751,120 on an unknown budget. Of that $1,751,120, the film made $1,675,196 domestically and $75,924 internationally. The film is ranked #7,479 in the all-time domestic box office rankings and #11,109 in the international box office rankings. On a per-theater average, the film made about $16,835 per screen.

Best of lists
 BuzzFeed 11 Best Movies of 2016
 Esquire Top 10 Documentaries of 2016
 The Hollywood Reporter - Critics' Picks: The 10 Best Documentaries of the year
 The Huffington Post 21 Best Movies of 2016
 IndieWire Best Movies of 2016
 GQ Best Movies of 2016
 Newsweek 21 Best Movies of 2016
 Thrillist Best Documentaries of 2016
 DC Outlook Top 10 Movies of 2016 (#1)

Accolades

Notes
1.Abedin and Weiner separated in 2017.

References

External links
 
 
 

2016 documentary films
2016 films
American documentary films
Documentary films about elections in the United States
Documentary films about New York City
Films shot in New York City
Politics of New York City
2010s English-language films
Anthony Weiner
2010s American films